Lekki British School (LBS) is a British international school in Lekki, Lagos State. It serves preschool, junior school, and high school in its  campus. There is a boarding facility for high school students. The school was established in September 2000.

As of 2013 the annual tuition for a day student is 2,911,300 Naira. As of 2013 the total cost for a boarding student is 4,000,300 Naira; the parents pay $19,500 U.S. dollars and 200,000 Naira. In 2013 Encomium Weekly ranked the school as being among the most expensive secondary schools in Lagos.

References

External links
 Lekki British School

International schools in Lagos
Lekki
British international schools in Nigeria
2000 establishments in Nigeria
Educational institutions established in 2000
Boarding schools in Nigeria